The Thief's Journal (Journal du voleur, published in 1949) is a novel by Jean Genet. It is a part-fact, part-fiction autobiography that charts the author's progress through Europe in a depoliticized 1930s, wearing nothing but rags and enduring hunger, contempt, fatigue and vice. The main character encounters bars, dives, flophouses, robbery, prison and expulsion in Spain, Italy, Austria, Czechoslovakia, Poland, Nazi Germany and Belgium.

The novel is structured around a series of homosexual love affairs and male prostitution between the author/anti-hero and various criminals, con artists, pimps, and a detective.

A common theme is the inversion of ideals: betrayal is the ultimate form of devotion, petty delinquency is brazen heroism, and confinement is freedom.

Under the inspiration of Being and Nothingness, the novel is dedicated to Jean-Paul Sartre and "Castor" ("beaver"), i.e. Simone de Beauvoir. Sartre wrote his essay "Saint Genet", influenced by this work, in 1952.

Genet appropriates Christian language and concepts to pursue an alternative form of "sainthood" with its own trinity of "virtues" – homosexuality, theft, and betrayal. Each burglary is set up as quasi-religious ritual, and the narrator describes his self-preparation for his crimes like that of a monk in a vigil of prayer, readying himself for a "holy" life. He establishes a "constructed reader," a fictional personification of the bourgeois values of the late 1940s, against which to measure his deviance from the "norms" of society.

1949 French novels
El Raval
Novels with gay themes
Novels by Jean Genet
Novels set in Barcelona
1940s LGBT novels
Novels about prostitution
French LGBT novels